Bradley is an unincorporated community located in the town of Bradley, Lincoln County, Wisconsin, United States.

References

Unincorporated communities in Lincoln County, Wisconsin
Unincorporated communities in Wisconsin